Naikanahatti  is a village in the southern state of Karnataka, India. It is located in the Challakere taluk of Chitradurga district in Karnataka.

Demographics
As of 2001 India census, Naikanahatti had a population of 12891 with 6580 males and 6311 females.

See also
 Chitradurga
 Districts of Karnataka

References

External links
 http://Chitradurga.nic.in/

Villages in Chitradurga district